Alcide is the French and Italian version of "Alcides", another name for Heracles.

Alcide may also refer to:

Art, entertainment, and media
 Alcide (Bortniansky), a 1778 opera by Dmitry Bortniansky
 Alcide (Marais), a 1693 opera by Marin Marais and Louis Lully
 Alcide Herveaux, a fictional character from The Southern Vampire Mysteries / Sookie Stackhouse Novels by Charlaine Harris
 Alcide, a fictional policeman in the French TV series The Returned
 Alcide Nikopol, the main character of the Nikopol Trilogy novels by French cartoonist Enki Bilal
 Alcide Jolivet, a fictional journalist in the novel Michael Strogoff: The Courier of the Czar by Jules Verne

Ships
 French ship Alcide (1743)
 French ship Alcide (1782)
 HMS Alcide, a list of ships with this name

Other uses
 Alcide (horse) (1955–1973), a British Thoroughbred racehorse
 8549 Alcide, a main belt asteroid
 Cyclone Alcide, in 2018

See also